Moggerhanger is a village in the English county of Bedfordshire. It is west of Sandy on the road to Bedford.  Its population in 2001 was 636, but had reduced to 620 at the 2011 Census.  In the twentieth century the village name was spelled variously as: Moggerhanger, Mogerhanger, Muggerhanger and Morehanger. Local pronunciation of the name is as Morhanger.

History
The civil parish name was known as Mogerhanger until April 2019, when the name was officially brought in line with that of the village. The parish includes the hamlet of Chalton which is mentioned in the Domesday Book of 1086, where it is listed amongst the lands held by Adeliza, wife of Hugh de Grandmesnil, on behalf of the King.  The land consisted of a mill, meadow for 10 ploughs and woodland for 16 pigs. This was said to be an outlying area of Potton which was held by the King's niece, Countess Judith.

Notable buildings
The parish church is dedicated to St. John the Evangelist. It was built in 1860 when the village, with the hamlet of Chalton, became a separate ecclesiastical parish.  Before that, they had been hamlets in the parish of Blunham.

Moggerhanger House, a Grade I listed building designed largely by John Soane, is situated in the village.

References

External links

Villages in Bedfordshire
Civil parishes in Bedfordshire
Central Bedfordshire District